I Will Always Love You is a 2006 Philippine romantic drama film directed by Mac C. Alejandre and starring Richard Gutierrez and Angel Locsin. The theme song of the film, "I'll Always Love You", is performed by Nina. The movie was produced by GMA Network and GMA Pictures with Regal Films Inc.

Plot
Justin (Richard Gutierrez) is a rich, smart, confident mestizo from a private school in Manila while Cecille (Angel Locsin) is a simple scholar from a rural public school. The two fall for each other against the wishes of his parents, (Jean Garcia and Lloyd Samartino). They want him to marry Donna (Bianca King), their business partner’s daughter.

His parents order Justin to study in the States to separate him from Cecille. But Justin finds a way to take her with him to San Francisco without anyone knowing. The young lovers live their dream in America. One day, however, Justin’s mother drops by to visit, bringing Donna with her. Justin hides Cecille with a family friend (Suzette Ranillo). One day, she catches him and Donna in a tight embrace.

She takes the first plane back to Manila, ignoring Justin’s attempts to explain why he was kissing Donna. Back home, Cecille’s childhood friend Andrew, (James Blanco) courts her relentlessly. In a few months, Andrew and Cecille are engaged to be married. And then, Justin flies home to try to win Cecille back.

Cast
Richard Gutierrez as Justin Ledesma
Angel Locsin as Cecille
James Blanco as Andrew
Bianca King as Donna
Tuesday Vargas as Frida
Bearwin Meily as Ogie
Jean Garcia as Adelle Ledesma
Lloyd Samartino as Edward Ledesma
Amy Austria as Encar

Also starring
Alphabetically
Melissa Aguirre as Cindy
Louie Alejandro as Peping
Malou Crisologo as Grace
Soliman Cruz as Roger
Karen delos Reyes as Tessa
Ehra Madrigal as Mitch
Miriam Pantig as Mrs. Rivera
Suzette Ranillo as Tita Emma
Miguel Tanfelix as Jonjon
Theo Trapalis as Student (USA)
Nash Aguas as young Justin
Gabriel Roxas as young Ogie
Miguel Aguila

References

External links

2006 films
2006 romantic drama films
GMA Pictures films
Philippine romantic drama films
2000s Tagalog-language films
2000s English-language films
Films directed by Mac Alejandre